Jarszewko  (formerly ) is a village in the administrative district of Gmina Stepnica, within Goleniów County, West Pomeranian Voivodeship, in north-western Poland. It is about 70 km from Szczecin and 30 km from Świnoujście. It is on the coast of the Szczecin Lagoon and has a population of about 80. It was first mentioned in 1590, and belonged to the family of von Flemming.

References

Villages in Goleniów County